Claud D. Grove and Berenice Sinclair Grove House, also known as the Hagener House and Edward G. Sinclair House , is a historic home located at Jefferson City, Cole County, Missouri. It was built about 1912, and is a two-story, Colonial Revival style brick dwelling with a projecting center gable. It has a slate hipped roof with shed dormer. It features a one-story front porch supported by one square and two round Tuscan order columns.

It was listed on the National Register of Historic Places in 2002.

References

Houses on the National Register of Historic Places in Missouri
Colonial Revival architecture in Missouri
Houses completed in 1912
Buildings and structures in Jefferson City, Missouri
National Register of Historic Places in Cole County, Missouri